Zbiginew Gawior (December 15, 1946 – May 20, 2003) was a Polish luger who competed in the late 1960s. He won a bronze medal in the men's doubles event at the 1967 FIL European Luge Championships in Königssee, West Germany.

Gawlor also finished sixth in the men's doubles event at the 1968 Winter Olympics in Grenoble.

References
List of European luge champions 
Wallechinsky, David. (1984). "Luge - Men's two-seater". The Complete Book of the Olympics: 1896-1980. New York: Penguin Books. p. 576.
Zbigniew Gawior's profile at Sports Reference.com

Lugers at the 1968 Winter Olympics
Polish male lugers
1946 births
2003 deaths
Olympic lugers of Poland
People from Leszno
Sportspeople from Greater Poland Voivodeship